Group 12 is the name of a defunct rugby league competition based around the outback city of Broken Hill in New South Wales, Australia. The last premiership was held in 1997 when Wilcannia beat Menindee.

Teams

Former Group 12 teams included:

 Broken Hill Geebungs
 Broken Hill Saints
 Broken Hill United
 Menindee Yabbies
 Wilcannia Boomerangs
 Wilcannia Tigers

First Grade Champions

Re-emergence
The Group 12 competition has been now been revived but in a different form as the Outback Rugby League.  Some of the Original Group 12 clubs have returned to the new league. The 2013 Competition teams are: 
 Broken Hill Saints
 Broken Hill GeeBungs
 Broken Hill Young Guns (juniors only)
 Wilcannia Boomerangs
 Wilcannia Warriors
 Menindee Yabbies
 Menindee Wedgetails (Eagles)
 Broken Hill United joined the ORL 2014 ...

References

Sport in Broken Hill, New South Wales
Defunct rugby league competitions in New South Wales